Pod is an archeological site in the municipality of Bugojno, Bosnia and Herzegovina.

The fortified site was first inhabited in the early Bronze Age and even eneolithic (2500 to 1700 BC).
After the Bronze Age it was uninhabited for four centuries, until repopulated in the early Iron Age (~700 BC) till the turn of the 4th and 3rd centuries BCE. Stratified materials from Pod defined Central Bosnian cultural group of the late Bronze Age. It was declared a National Monument of Bosnia and Herzegovina.

Excavations 
Archaeological excavation was undertaken there led by Branka Raunig in 1973.

References 

Hill forts in Bosnia and Herzegovina
Prehistoric sites in Bosnia and Herzegovina
Archaeological sites in Bosnia and Herzegovina
Archaeology of Illyria